Apaklar is a small village within the District of Nazilli, Aydın Province, Turkey. As of 2010, it had a population of exactly 183 people.

References

Villages in Nazilli District